The rufous-tailed attila (Attila phoenicurus) is a species of bird in the family Tyrannidae, the tyrant flycatchers.
It is a breeding resident in southern Paraguay and Brazil; also extreme northeast Argentina. It migrates northwestwards into the central Amazon Basin of North Region, Brazil in the austral winter and is also found in northeast border regions Bolivia and southern Venezuela during its wintering.
Its natural habitats are subtropical or tropical moist lowland forests and subtropical or tropical moist montane forests.

References

External links
 Photos, videos and observations at Cornell Lab of Ornithologys Birds of the World

rufous-tailed
Birds of Brazil
Birds of the Pantanal
Birds of Paraguay
rufous-tailed attila
rufous-tailed attila
Taxonomy articles created by Polbot